is a private university in Kurashiki, Okayama, Japan. The predecessor of the school was founded in 1930, and it was chartered as a junior college in 1951. In 1966 it became a four-year college.

External links
 Official website 

Educational institutions established in 1930
Private universities and colleges in Japan
Universities and colleges in Okayama Prefecture
1930 establishments in Japan